Nymphicula ochrepunctalis is a moth in the family Crambidae. It was described by David John Lawrence Agassiz in 2014. It is found in Papua New Guinea (the Western Province) and Australia, where it has been recorded from Queensland and the Northern Territory.

The wingspan is about 11 mm. The base of the forewing is whitish with a dark fuscous subbasal fascia and a white antemedian band, tinged with ochreous and edged with dark fuscous. The medial area is dark brown. The base of the hindwings is whitish, suffused with fuscous. The antemedian band is brownish and the tornal streak is ochreous.

Etymology
The species name refers to the ochreous spot in the middle of the hindwings.

References

Nymphicula
Moths described in 2014